Events from the year 1763 in Scotland.

Incumbents

Law officers 
 Lord Advocate – Thomas Miller of Glenlee
 Solicitor General for Scotland – James Montgomery jointly with Francis Garden

Judiciary 
 Lord President of the Court of Session – Lord Arniston, the younger
 Lord Justice General –  vacant until April; then Duke of Queensberry
 Lord Justice Clerk – Lord Tinwald, then Lord Minto

Events 
 16 May – James Boswell is introduced to Samuel Johnson at Thomas Davies's bookshop in London. Boswell records the event:
[Boswell:] "Mr. Johnson, I do indeed come from Scotland, but I cannot help it."
[Johnson:] "That, Sir, I find, is what a very great many of your countrymen cannot help."
 21–29 May – John Wesley travels in Scotland.
 26 June – Stagecoach service between Glasgow and Greenock initiated.
 July – construction of Coldstream Bridge across the border with England begins.
 August 5–6 – Battle of Bushy Run (Pontiac's War) in Pennsylvania: 77th Regiment of Foot (Montgomerie's Highlanders) fight on the winning British side prior to disbandment. 78th Fraser Highlanders are also disbanded.
 August 6 – the post of Historiographer Royal for Scotland is revived for Rev. William Robertson, Principal of the University of Edinburgh.
 Before October? – a pamphlet promoting creation of a British colony of Charlotina in North America is published in Edinburgh.
 1 October – construction of first North Bridge, Edinburgh, begins, including drainage of eastern end of Nor Loch. The Edinburgh Physick Garden moves from a site by the loch to Leith Walk.

Births 
 March – Mary Campbell (Highland Mary), dairymaid, beloved and a muse of Robert Burns (died 1786)
 12 May – John Bell, surgeon (died 1820 in Rome)
 29 June – Charles Hope, Lord Granton, politician and judge (died 1851)
 9 August – James Leith, army officer and colonial governor (died 1816 in Barbados)
 10 September – James Thomson, weaver poet (died 1832)
 27 October – William Maclure, geologist of North America (died 1840 in Mexico)
 6 December – Mary Anne Burges, religious allegorist (died 1813 in England)
 Approximate date – William McCoy, naval mutineer (suicide 1798 on Pitcairn Island)

Deaths 
 5 March – William Smellie, obstetrician (born 1697)
 30 September – William Duff, 1st Earl Fife (born 1696)

The arts
 March – James Macpherson, supposedly translating "Ossian", publishes Temora: An ancient epic poem; also this year Hugh Blair writes A Critical Dissertation on the Poems of Ossian.
 Before April? – English satirical poet Charles Churchill writes The Prophecy of Famine: A Scots Pastoral.
 St Cecilia's Hall is opened by Edinburgh Musical Society as the first purpose-built concert hall in Scotland (architect: Robert Mylne).

See also 

 Timeline of Scottish history

References 

 
Years of the 18th century in Scotland
Scotland
1760s in Scotland